Gillian Ann Burns  (born 12 July 1964) is a former rugby union player who represented England between 1988 and 2002, including when they won the 1994 Women's Rugby World Cup. She also captained her country between 1994 and 1999. She was selected for England only one year 
after first playing rugby union. She went on to play in four World Cups, 
including the inaugural Women's Rugby World Cuphosted by Wales in 1991.where England lost to the United States 19–6. Burns was also appointed a Member of the Order of the British Empire (MBE) in the 2005 Birthday Honours for services to sport.

One season after retiring from the England squad, Burns was asked to captain the first ever Women's World XV for their 2 test series in New Zealand.

After retiring as a player, Burns was appointed President of the Rugby Football Union for Womenwho helped administer the Women's game in England and also worked briefly as a guest commentator for Sky Sports.
Burns was the first woman to be made a Privileged Member of the RFU in 2012. She was inducted into the IRB Hall of Fame on 17 November 2014.

, Burns is a teacher at Range High School, she stopped teaching in 2016..

References 

1964 births
Living people
England women's international rugby union players
English female rugby union players
Female rugby union players
Rugby union number eights
Members of the Order of the British Empire